Extreme Fishing with Robson Green is a factual entertainment show broadcast on Channel 5. The show sees actor and fishing enthusiast Robson Green travel around the world in search of the greatest fishing destinations. There have been five series to date. A spin-off series entitled Robson's Extreme Fishing Challenge began airing on 9 April 2012, and a sequel series (Robson Green: Extreme Fisherman), is set to begin on 4 August 2014 on Quest. Extreme Fishing with Robson Green was re-launched for a one-off special episode on 12 February 2021 based in Leicester.

Series 1

Series 2

Series 3 - The World Tour: Part 1

Series 4 - The World Tour: Part 2

Series 5 - At the ends of the Earth

Robson's Extreme Fishing Challenge

The spin-off series from Extreme Fishing with Robson Green is Robson's Extreme Fishing Challenge where Green heads around the world taking on local fishing champions from that nation. The series started on 9 April 2012.

Robson Green: Extreme Fisherman

With the series moving from channel 5 to Quest, the title was changed to reflect that he is now one of the world's most experienced fishermen, rather than the mere amateur he was before. The series will be based on the same premise as its predecessors, and is produced by the same team. As-yet confirmed locations visited in the upcoming series are Borneo, Mongolia, Japan and the Solomon Islands

DVD releases 

The series is distributed on DVD by Acorn Media UK. Series 1, 2 and 3 are available.

References

External links
 
 Extreme Fishing with Robson Green at Channel 5

2008 British television series debuts
2011 British television series endings
2000s British reality television series
2010s British reality television series
English-language television shows
Channel 5 (British TV channel) original programming
Fishing television series
Television series by Banijay